WBXV-LP, virtual channel 13 (UHF digital channel 21), was a low-powered Sonlife-affiliated television station licensed to Louisville, Kentucky, United States. The station was owned by L4 Media Group.

The station's license was cancelled by the Federal Communications Commission on May 15, 2019.

Digital television

Digital channels

References

External links

Low-power television stations in the United States
BXV-LP
Television channels and stations established in 1994
1994 establishments in Kentucky
Defunct television stations in the United States
Television channels and stations disestablished in 2019
2019 disestablishments in Kentucky
Defunct mass media in Louisville, Kentucky